The 2019–20 UEFA Youth League was the seventh season of the UEFA Youth League, a European youth club football competition organised by UEFA.

Following the round of 16, the competition was postponed indefinitely due to the COVID-19 pandemic in Europe. The final tournament consisting of the semi-finals and final, originally scheduled to be played on 17 and 20 April 2020 at the Colovray Stadium in Nyon, Switzerland, were officially postponed on 18 March 2020. On 17 June 2020, UEFA announced that the remaining matches, including two round of 16 matches, quarter-finals, semi-finals and final, would be played between 16 and 25 August at the Colovray Stadium in Nyon, Switzerland behind closed doors.

Real Madrid defeated Benfica in the final 3–2 to win their first title. Porto were the defending champions, but were eliminated by Red Bull Salzburg in the play-offs.

Teams
A total of 64 teams from at least 32 of the 55 UEFA member associations could enter the tournament. They were split into two sections, each with 32 teams:
UEFA Champions League Path: The youth teams of the 32 clubs which qualified for the 2019–20 UEFA Champions League group stage entered the UEFA Champions League Path. If there was a vacancy (youth teams not entering), it was filled by a team defined by UEFA.
Domestic Champions Path: The youth domestic champions of the top 32 associations according to their 2018 UEFA country coefficients entered the Domestic Champions Path. If there was a vacancy (associations with no youth domestic competition, as well as youth domestic champions already included in the UEFA Champions League path), it was first filled by the title holders should they have not yet qualified, and then by the youth domestic champions of the next association in the UEFA ranking.

For this season, 41 associations were represented, with Estonia being represented for the first time.

Notes

Squads
Teams could name a squad of no more than forty players. A maximum of five players could be born between 1 January 2000 and 31 December 2000, with no more than three of these players in a matchday squad, while the remainder had to be born on or after 1 January 2001.

Round and draw dates
The schedule of the competition was as follows (all draws were held at the UEFA headquarters in Nyon, Switzerland, unless stated otherwise).
For the UEFA Champions League Path group stage, in principle the teams played their matches on Tuesdays and Wednesdays of the matchdays as scheduled for UEFA Champions League, and on the same day as the corresponding senior teams; however, matches could also be played on other dates, including Mondays and Thursdays.
For the Domestic Champions Path first and second rounds, in principle matches were played on Wednesdays (first round on matchdays 2 and 3, second round on matchdays 4 and 5, as scheduled for UEFA Champions League); however, matches could also be played on other dates, including Mondays, Tuesdays and Thursdays.
For the play-offs, round of 16 and quarter-finals, in principle matches were played on Tuesdays and Wednesdays of the matchdays as scheduled; however, matches could also be played on other dates, provided they were completed before the following dates:
Play-offs: 13 February 2020
Round of 16: 6 March 2020
Quarter-finals: 20 March 2020

The competition was suspended on 17 March 2020 due to the COVID-19 pandemic in Europe. The final tournament consisting of the semi-finals and final, originally scheduled to be played on 17 and 20 April 2020 at the Colovray Stadium in Nyon, Switzerland, wad officially postponed on 18 March 2020. A working group was set up by UEFA to decide the calendar of the remainder of the season, with the final decision made at the UEFA Executive Committee meeting on 17 June 2020.

UEFA Champions League Path

For the UEFA Champions League Path, the 32 teams were drawn into eight groups of four. There was no separate draw held, with the group compositions identical to the draw for the 2019–20 UEFA Champions League group stage, which was held on 29 August 2019, 18:00 CEST, at the Grimaldi Forum in Monaco.

In each group, teams played against each other home-and-away in a round-robin format. The group winners advanced to the round of 16, while the eight runners-up advanced to the play-offs, where they were joined by the eight second round winners from the Domestic Champions Path. The matchdays were 17–18 September, 1–2 October, 22–23 October, 5–6 November, 26–27 November, and 10–11 December 2019.

Group A

Group B

Group C

Group D

Group E

Group F

Group G

Group H

Domestic Champions Path

For the Domestic Champions Path, the 32 teams were drawn into two rounds of two-legged home-and-away ties. The draw for both the first round and second round was held on 3 September 2019, 14:00 CEST, at the UEFA headquarters in Nyon, Switzerland. There were no seedings, but the 32 teams were split into groups defined by sporting and geographical criteria prior to the draw.

In both rounds, if the aggregate score was tied after full-time of the second leg, the away goals rule was used to decide the winner. If still tied, the match was decided by a penalty shoot-out (no extra time was played). The eight second round winners advanced to the play-offs, where they were joined by the eight group runners-up from the UEFA Champions League Path (group stage).

First round

Second round

Play-offs

Knockout phase

Bracket (round of 16 onwards)

Round of 16

Quarter-finals

Semi-finals

Final

Statistics

Top goalscorers
There were 554 goals scored in 167 matches, for an average of  goals per match.

Notes

Notes

References

External links

UEFA Youth League Matches: 2019–20, UEFA.com

 
Youth
2019-20
2019 in youth association football
2020 in youth association football
Association football events postponed due to the COVID-19 pandemic